Booneacris glacialis, the wingless mountain grasshopper, is a species of spur-throated grasshopper in the family Acrididae. It is found in North America.

Subspecies
These three subspecies belong to the species Booneacris glacialis:
 Booneacris glacialis amplicerca (Caudell, 1936) i c g
 Booneacris glacialis canadensis (E. M. Walker, 1903) i c g
 Booneacris glacialis glacialis (Scudder, 1863) i c g
Data sources: i = ITIS, c = Catalogue of Life, g = GBIF, b = Bugguide.net

References

Melanoplinae
Articles created by Qbugbot
Insects described in 1863